The Old Dutch Capuchine is a breed of fancy pigeon developed over many years of selective breeding. Old Dutch Capuchines, along with other varieties of domesticated pigeons, are all descendants of the rock dove (Columba livia).

This breed of pigeon is known for its head crest. It is famous in Biggleswade, Malaysia and Singapore.

See also 

List of pigeon breeds

References

Pigeon breeds
Pigeon breeds originating in the Netherlands